Dayao is a rural town under the administration of and in the south of Liuyang, Hunan, China. Dayao is well known for its firework industry. Yanghua Township merged to Dayao on November 18, 2015. The town is bordered to the north by Hehua Subdistrict, to the east by Chengtanjiang Town, to the south by the towns of Jingang and Litian, and to the west by Chengchong Town.

History
Dayao was incorporated as a township in 1956.

It was upgraded to a town in 1995.

Yanghua Township merged to Dayao on November 18, 2015.

On 14 October 2016, the town was listed among the first group of "Distinctive Towns in China" by the National Development and Reform Commission, Ministry of Finance and Ministry of Housing and Urban-Rural Development.

Administrative division
The town is divided into 11 villages and four communities, the following areas: 
 Nanchuan Community 
 Chongwen Community
 Tianhe Community
 Huifeng Community
 Shangsheng Village
 Nanshan Village
 Nanyang Village
 Litian Village
 Fenglin Village
 Qaingsheng Village
 Laogui New Village
 Xinhe Village
 Duanli Village
 Huayuan Village
 Yanghua Village

Geography
Nanchuan River flows through the town.

Mountains located adjacent to and visible from the townsite are: Mount Jiuhua and Mount Xianglujian.

There are two reservoirs in the town: Tuanjie Reservoir and Tianzi Reservoir.

Economy
The town's main industries are fireworks, building materials, ceramics and machinery manufacture.

Education
 Dayao Middle School
 Liuyang No. 2 High School

Hospital
 Liuyang No. 6 Hospital

Transportation

Expressway
The Changsha–Liuyang Expressway, from Changsha, running north to south through the town to Jiangxi.

National Highway
The town is connected to two National highways: G319 and G106.

Provincial Highway
The Provincial Highway S310 passes across the town west to east.

County Roads
The town has three county roads: Daqing County Road, Dayang County Road and Yangda County Road.

Religion
Qiuxiangu Temple, Sanyuan Palace, Temple of the God of Wealth and Shejun Temple are Taoist temples in the town.

Jinshushan Temple is a Buddhist temple in the town.

Attractions
The main attractions are the Grand House of Qiu Family, Former Residence of Li Tian and Li Tian Park.

There are a number of popular mountains located immediately adjacent to the townsite which include Mount Lion, Mount Jiuhua and Mount Yuntai.

Notable people
 Li Tian, the inventor of fireworks.
 Zhang Shaoxiu, physician.
 Ouyang Shouting, Xiang opera proformer.
 Wang Zhengquan, educator.
 Wang Renmei , actress.
 Wang Renyi, musician.
 Deng Gongwei, revolutionary martyr.

References

External links

Divisions of Liuyang
Liuyang